Vincent Alexander Barnes (born 15 February 1960 in Cape Town) is a former South African first-class cricketer who played for Western Province and Transvaal.

Barnes, a coloured fast bowler with a slingy action, played most of his cricket during the apartheid years which meant he was confined to the Howa Bowl. The Western Province paceman was the competition's most successful bowler and topped the wicket-taking lists with 41 wickets at 7.75 in 1982–83 and 42 wickets at 10.14 in 1986–87. Barnes also spent a season at Transvaal in 1985–86 and was one of three bowlers to finish with a competition high 36 scalps. He took his career best figures of 9 for 46 in the second innings of a match against Natal in 1983–84.

Following his retirement from cricket, Barnes became a coach and was in charge of South Africa's Under-19s from 1997 to 1999. He was then appointed as the coach of South Africa A before joining the national team as an assistant coach to Mickey Arthur.

References

1960 births
Living people
South African cricketers
Cricketers from Cape Town
Western Province cricketers
Gauteng cricketers
South African cricket coaches